Tamizhaga Makkal Munnetra Kazhagam (Tamil People's Progressive Federation) is a political party in the Indian state of Tamil Nadu.  It was founded in 2000.

References

Political parties in Tamil Nadu
2000 establishments in Tamil Nadu
Political parties established in 2000